is a train station on the Hankyu Railway Kyoto Line located in Mukō, Kyoto Prefecture, Japan.

Lines
Hankyu Kyoto Main Line

Layout
The station has two side platforms serving two tracks. The platforms are connected each other by an underground passage, which are accessible with slopes elevators. A bus terminal is located outside the East Exit at the south end of Kawaramachi-bound platform. The West Exit is at the south end of Umeda-bound platform.

History
On 1 October 1972 when the town of Mukō (Mukō-machi in Japanese) became a city (Mukō-shi in Japanese), the station name was changed to the current one.

Station numbering was introduced to all Hankyu stations on 21 December 2013 with this station being designated as station number HK-79.

Ridership
In fiscal 2013 (April 2013 to March 2014), about 2,998,000 passengers started travel from this station annually. For historical data, see the table below.

Stations next to Higashi-Mukō

References

External links
 Higashi-Mukō Station from Hankyu Railway website 

Hankyu Kyoto Main Line
Railway stations in Kyoto Prefecture
Railway stations in Japan opened in 1928
Mukō